In Windhoek, Namibia, Independence Avenue runs through the heart of downtown and is "easily explored by foot". Prior to independence, the street was known as Kaiserstrasse.

Notable buildings and parks on Independence Avenue

 Sanlam Centre, which is host to a number of embassies, including the embassy of Germany in Windhoek
 Zoo Park (corner of Fidel Castro St. and Independence)

References

Geography of Windhoek
Roads in Namibia